Lois Joseph (born 31 July 1934) is an Australian fencer. She competed in the women's individual foil event at the 1956 Summer Olympics.

References

1934 births
Living people
Australian female foil fencers
Olympic fencers of Australia
Fencers at the 1956 Summer Olympics